Estádio Lourival Baptista, commonly known as Batistão, is a multi-use stadium located in Aracaju, Brazil. It is used mostly for football matches and hosts the home matches of Associação Desportiva Confiança, Cotinguiba, Club Sportivo Sergipe and Vasco Esporte Clube. The stadium has a maximum capacity of 15,575 people, and was built in 1969.

References

External links
Templos do Futebol

Football venues in Sergipe
Sports venues in Sergipe
Associação Desportiva Confiança
Club Sportivo Sergipe
Sports venues completed in 1969
1969 establishments in Brazil